André Knevel (born January 13, 1950) is a Canadian concert organist, arranger, accompanist, and organ teacher. He performs the works of major organ composers and also improvises on well-known themes and hymn melodies.

Early life and education 

Knevel was born in Bussum, Netherlands to Gerrit Knevel, an architect and Dirkje Willemijndje Knevel-Slot, a homemaker. He started taking organ and piano lessons at eight years old. His performed his first official organ recital at age 19, and was appointed as church organist in Hilversum.

After immigrating to Canada in 1975, Knevel took up residence in St. Catharines, Ontario. His Royal Conservatory studies were completed with Dr. John Tuttle, Associate Professor of the University of Toronto.

Career

Knevel has given many recitals throughout Canada, United States, Germany, Russia, Poland, Czech Republick, Europe, and South Africa. Each summer he tours in the Netherlands, where he performs between 30 and 40 concerts on many of the large pipe organs across the country. He has also given recitals on the organs of Wittenberg and Torgau, Germany and in cathedrals of Bucharest and Timișoara, Romania.

Knevel is the regular organist of the Mattaniah Christian Male Choir from Dundas, Ontario and a frequent guest organist for other choirs, including Musica Sacra Chorus and the Ottawa Carleton Male Choir, among others. He has served as an accompanist for solo instruments such as flute, panflute, violin, harp and piano. He regularly records and performs with panflutist Liselotte Rokyta

Knevel has published 30 organ solo recordings and contributed to many other recordings with choirs and other solo instrumentalists. Fellow organists Lenard Verkamman and Pieter Heykoop have both worked as registration assistants for several of André's recordings.

Knevel maintains a full teaching schedule for both organ and piano at his home and in several nearby private schools.

Discography

Solo 

St. Catherines – in concert, 1975, Heidebrecht Recording Service AK 2778
Hamilton, 1978, Heidebrecht Recording Service AK 002 
Maassluis – Loofd God Met Bazuingeklank, 1979, Vista VRS 1701
Nijmegen, 1981, Jubal ZV 8131
Kampen, 1982, Jubal ZV 8239
Breda, 1984, Jubal ZV 8555
Amsterdam & Bolsward, 1985, De Bazuin MC 8638
Amsterdam, 1985, S.T.B. 220 249
Bolsward, 1986, Mirasound MO 20.4021
Hasselt, 1987, Mirasound MO 39.9012
Arnhem, 1989, Mirasound MO 39.9031
Dordrecht, 1990, Mirasound MO 39.9054
Zaltbommel, 1991, Mirasound MO 399077
Den Haag, 1992, Mirasound MO 399117
Kampen – speelt op verzoek, 1994, STH CD 19334
Bolsward – 25 jaar, 1995, STH CD 19365
Amersfoort – Feike Asma André Knevel, 1997, STH CD 197022
Grimsby – Opus 189, 2003, Audiocraft Productions Crescendo CD 9024
In Concert Volume 1, 2003, STH CD 1403052
Welzalig Hij Die In Der Bozen Raad Volume 1, 2004, STH CD 1404862
Dat Op Uw Klacht De Hemel Scheure Volume 2, 2004, STH CD 1404872
Groot En Eeuwig Opperwezen Volume 3, 2005, STH CD 1405882
Genâ, O God Genâ, Hoor Mijn Gebeên Volume 4, 2005, STH CD 1405892
Men Voer' Dien God Geschenken Aan Volume 5, 2005, STH CD 1405902
In Concert Volume 2, 2006, STH CD 1406452
Music of Praise & Meditation, Volume 1, 2006, Audiocraft Productions Crescendo CD 9045
Komt, Laat Ons Samen Isrels HEER' Volume 6, 2008, STH CD 1408912
God Heb Ik Lief Want Die Getrouwe Heer Volume 7, 2009, STH CD 1409922
Looft Den Heer' Want Hij Is Goed Volume 8, 2011, STH CD 1411932
Amazing Grace – 40 years organist, 2010, STH CD 1410092

Ensemble 

Let The Mountains Shout, Jubal Records JJ 001 (with Brampton Christian Choral Society)
He Touched Me, Sharon Records SRN 3027 (with Ontario Christian Music Assembly)
Classical Duets, 1981, World Records WRC 1-1876 (with Eleonore Krullaarts)
Sing Unto The Lord With The Voice Of A Psalm, (with NRC Choir St. Catherines)
Aloud Proclaim His Praise, Audiocraft Productions (with Hosanna Choir)
Mommy Loves Me, This I Know, 1993, Crescendo CC CD 930729
Heathen Lands and Hostile Peoples, 1993, Crescendo CC CD 930807 (with NRC Choir Chilliwack)
Christian Festival Concert 1994, Audiocraft Productions Crescendo 86 (with Ontario Christian Music Assembly)
Our World Of Music – A Prayer, 1995, Crescendo CC CD 950228
Unto The Lord Lift Thankful Voices, 1995, STH CC CD 950808 (with Mattaniah Christian Male Choir)
Glory To God In The Highest, 1996, STH CC CD 960628 (with Mattaniah Christian Male Choir)
The City Of Light, 1997, STH CC CD 197052 (with Mattaniah Christian Male Choir)
Men Sing Thy Praise, O God Volume 1, 1997, STH CC CD 197053 (with Mattaniah Christian Male Choir)
Panflute Melodies Volume 1, 1999, STH CD 1499272 (with Liselotte Rokyta)
Great Is Thy Name O Lord, 1999, STH CC CD 1499402 (with Mattaniah Christian Male Choir)
Men Sing Thy Praise, O God Volume 2, 1999, STH CC CD 1499552 (with Mattaniah Christian Male Choir)
Christian Festival Concert 1999, Audiocraft Productions Crescendo CD (with Ontario Christian Music Assembly)
Songs Of Adoration Bring, 2000, STH CC CD 1400402 (with Mattaniah Christian Male Choir)
Christian Festival Concert 2000, Audiocraft Productions Cres CD (with Ontario Christian Music Assembly)
Instrumental Melodies, 2001, STH CD 1401442 (with Stephanie Numan Scholman & Andrew Knevel)
Come, Bless The Lord, 2001, STH CC CD 1401452 (with Mattaniah Christian Male Choir)
Men Sing Thy Praise, O God Volume 3, 2001, STH CC CD 1401462 (with Mattaniah Christian Male Choir)
From Sea To Utmost Sea, 2001, STH CC CD 1402452 (with Mattaniah Christian Male Choir)
A World Of Music, 2001 (with Ottawa Carleton Male Choir)
Christian Festival Concert 2001, Audiocraft Productions Cres CD (with Ontario Christian Music Assembly)
Christian Festival Concert 2002, Audiocraft Productions Cres CD (with Ontario Christian Music Assembly)
Christian Festival Concert 2003, Audiocraft Productions Cres CD (with Ontario Christian Music Assembly)
Consider the House Of The Lord, 2004, STH CC CD 1404402 (with Mattaniah Christian Male Choir)
Geloofd Met Psalmgezang, 2004, VVR 040902 (Samenzang)
Door Ijver Aangespoord, 2004, VVR 040903 (with Laudate Deum)
Christian Festival Concert 2004, Audiocraft Productions Cres CD (with Ontario Christian Music Assembly)
Christian Festival Concert 2005, Audiocraft Productions Cres CD (with Ontario Christian Music Assembly)
Panflute Melodies Volume 2, 2006, STH CD 1406442 (with Liselotte Rokyta)
International Trio, 2006, STH CD 1406632 (with Liselotte Rokyta & Jan Elsenaar)
Christian Festival Concert 2006, Audiocraft Productions (with Ontario Christian Music Assembly)
O'ral Is Mij God, 2007, VVR 070810 (with Liselotte Rokyta & Jan Elsenaar)
Prayer For Grace, 2007, STH CC CD 1407562 (with Mattaniah Christian Male Choir)
Children's Songs, 2007, STH CD 1407602 (with Liselotte Rokyta)
Panflute Melodies Volume 3, 2008, STH CD 1408442 (with Liselotte Rokyta)
Panflute Melodies Volume 4 Sacred, 2009, STH CD 1409442 (with Liselotte Rokyta)
The Banner Of The Cross, 2009, STH CC CD 1409562 (with Mattaniah Christian Male Choir)
Panflute Melodies Volume 5, 2010, STH CD 1410442 (with Liselotte Rokyta)
Panflute Melodies Volume 6, 2011, STH CD 1411442 (with Liselotte Rokyta)
With A Joyful Song, 2011, STH CC CD 1411512 (with Mattaniah Christian Male Choir)
Panflute Melodies Volume 7 Christmas, 2012, STH CD 1412442 (with Liselotte Rokyta)

Sheet Music 
 
André Knevel has issued the following Dutch chorale preludes and organ solos in sheetmusic, which typically originate as improvisations from recordings, and are later transcribed for publication.  They are published in both standard notation as well as in klavarskribo
Willemsen 828: Toccata in G Minor
Ambitus 18: Abide With Me, Psalm 150
Ambitus 31: Neem Heer' Mij Beide Handen, Gouden Harpen Ruisen, Psalm 97
Ambitus 40: Rondo In G Major
Ambitus 61: The Lord's My Shepherd
Ambitus 63: Teach Me Thy Way, As The Deer, All Through The Night
Cantique 190: Psalm 75
Cantique 205: Wie Maar De Goede God Laat Zorgen
Cantique 280: Psalm 138, Lead Me Lord, Ere Zij Aan God De Vader
Cantique 282: Alle Roem Is Uitgesloten, I Will Sing Of My Redeemer
Cantique 287: Psalm 42, How Great Thou Art
Cantique 299: Theme from Beethoven's 9th Symphony
Cantique 365: Psalm 68, Psalm 79, Vaste Rots Van Mijn Behoud
Cantique 368: Psalm 25, Doorgrond Mijn Hart En Ken Mijn Weg O Heer, Een Vaste Burg Is Onze God
Cantique 376: Psalm 77, Ik Ga Slapen Ik Ben Moe, 'k Wil U O God Mijn Dank Betalen
Cantique 384: Canadian And Dutch Anthems
Cantique 392: Op Bergen En In Dalen, Op U Mijn Heiland Blijf Ik Hopen
Cantique 395: Heugelijke Tijding, Rule Brittania
Cantique 404: Psalm 118, God Roept Ons Broeders Tot De Daad
Cantique 408: Psalm 108, Rijst Op Rijst Op Voor Jezus

References

External links 

 Official Website

1950 births
Living people
Canadian organists
Male organists
Dutch organists
Dutch emigrants to Canada
People from Bussum
21st-century organists
21st-century Canadian male musicians